Virapandy Road railway station is located in Salem Junction to Erode Junction line double electrified track; Only Passenger trains halt here. From here we can go to Erode, Mettur Dam, Jolarpettai, Coimbatore and Salem by train.

References

External links

Railway stations in Salem district
Salem railway division